Qoqmončaq is a mixed language based on Kazakh, Mongolian, and Solon, spoken by about 200 people in the Xinjiang Uyghur Autonomous Region of the People's Republic of China.

References

Languages of China
Mixed languages
Kazakh language
Mongolian language